Claude Perchat (28 February 1952 – 12 November 2022) was a French graphic designer and illustrator.

Biography
Perchat began her artistic career with La Poste in 2000. The creator of many first day of issue covers, she also illustrated many of the designs of the historical collections of postage stamps. She was the author of the travel diary La France à Vivre, published by La Poste in 2004. Her last stamp was issued in 2018, the distributor stamp of the national exhibition of maximaphily in Valenciennes.

Claude Perchat died on 12 November 2022, at the age of 70.

References

1952 births
2022 deaths
20th-century French illustrators
French graphic designers
French women illustrators
Women graphic designers
20th-century French women artists
21st-century French artists
21st-century French women artists
Artists from Paris